Muirs Highway is a Western Australian highway linking Manjimup and Mount Barker on the Albany Highway. It provides a shorter distance between Manjimup and Albany. It is a lonely highway surrounded with karri and jarrah forests with no settlements in between except the small farming settlement of Rocky Gully.

It is primarily used as a freight route for plantation timber trucks and interstate long vehicles servicing the horticultural areas of the south west. The road is a two way, single carriageway bitumen surfaced highway.

The highway passes through several localities including Manjimup, Dingup, Nyamup, Strachan, Murtinup, Rocky Gully and Mount Barker.
 
Muirs Highway was named after brothers Thomas and John Muir, the first European settlers in the Warren district, who settled at Deeside in 1852 and built a rush hut there in 1856.

See also

 Highways in Australia
 List of highways in Western Australia

References

Highways in rural Western Australia